See Angkor and Die is a 1993 Cambodian romantic drama film directed by Norodom Sihanouk.

Cast
San Chariya   
Roland Eng   
Mam Kanika   
Sina Than

External links
 

1993 films
Cambodian drama films
Khmer-language films
1993 romantic drama films